The Volkswagen Tiguan is a car produced by German manufacturer Volkswagen since 2007, sitting between the smaller T-Roc and the larger Touareg in the company's crossover SUV range. The first generation is based on the PQ46 platform, while the second generation, released in 2016, utilizes the Volkswagen Group MQB A2 platform. It is generally considered to be a medium-sized SUV in Europe, while in North America it is considered to be a compact crossover.

The name Tiguan is a portmanteau of the German words Tiger ("tiger") and Leguan ("iguana") and won a naming contest by German car magazine publisher Auto Bild—from a field of names that also included Namib, Rockton, Samun and Nanuk.

As of the spring of 2020, six million units had been sold worldwide, with 910,926 units manufactured in 2019 alone, making the Tiguan the best-selling car overall in the Volkswagen Group. It was also the best-selling SUV in Europe.



First generation (5N; 2007) 

The first generation Tiguan was initially shown as a concept vehicle at the LA Auto Show in November 2006. The production form of the Tiguan was revealed online in June 2007 following a prototype preview in Namibia, before being officially launched at the Frankfurt International Motor Show in September 2007.

The Tiguan went on sale in Europe in early 2008, and was initially available with two engines, a 2.0-litre  TDI and a 1.4-litre  TSI petrol unit. All first generation Tiguans featured two-row seating and transversely mounted four-cylinder engines. Production began in the end of 2007 at Volkswagen's subsidiary Auto 5000 in Wolfsburg and continued subsequently under the company's standard contract arrangements, at Wolfsburg and in Kaluga, Russia.

The first generation Tiguan is based on the PQ46 platform, which is shared with the four corporate siblings, Volkswagen Passat (B6), Volkswagen Sharan (7N), Škoda Superb (3T) and SEAT Alhambra (7N). A common misconception is that the Tiguan is built on the PQ35 chassis that underpins the Mk5 and Mk6 generation Volkswagen Golf. While the PQ46 chassis is based upon the PQ35 platform, there are several differences between the more entry level PQ35 and the mid range PQ46. It shares the same dashboard design with the Golf Plus.

Markets

Europe

Trim levels

The Tiguan in Europe was offered worldwide in various trim levels. In the United States, trim levels included S, SE, and SEL. In the United Kingdom, trim levels were S, Match, Sport, and Escape. In Canada, trim levels were Trendline, Comfortline, and Highline with an optional sport package. In Russia and other markets, trim levels included Trend & Fun, Sport & Style, and Track & Field. European markets received an R-Line trim level beginning in 2010.

The Trend & Fun specification offered a maximum approach angle of 18 degrees. Features included six airbags, ESP, Trailer Stability Program integrated with the ESP, ISOFIX child seat anchorages on the rear bench and electronic parking brake with auto hold function, RCD 210 radio with integrated CD player, semi automatic climate control system, four electric window lifts, electrically adjustable and heated outside mirrors, trip computer, RF remote control of central locking and various storage compartments and bins.

Sport & Style offered additional features, including 17-inch alloy wheels, chrome roof rail, chrome strips on front bumper and surrounding side window lining, tinted windows, sport seats with height adjustable lumbar supports center console with folding and height adjustable armrest, folding front passenger seat, drawers under the front seats, folding table and storage pockets on the backs of the front seats, leather for steering wheel, gear shift knob and gear shift boot, fabric seats with Alcantara accents, cruise control system and tire pressure indicator.

The Track & Field package featured a redesigned front module, with a 28 degree approach angle, hill descent assistant, modified driving pedal characteristic, EDS adaptation (electronic differential locks are activated at the slightest slip), ABS adaptation (which aids with braking on loose substrates), hill ascent assistance, automatic transmission gear level pre-selection (including optimal engine braking effect), 16 inch alloy wheels, tire pressure indicator, black roof rails, engine underbody protection, compass display, special door impact guard strips and seats with adjustable lumbar support.

China 
The import version of Tiguan appeared on the Chinese market in 2009, with a locally built version (aka Shanghai-Volkswagen Tiguan) debuting at 2009 Guangzhou Motor Show. The Chinese built Tiguan uses 1.8-litre TSI  and 2.0-litre TSI , and has a revised front fascia. At the same time, the import Tiguan is still sold in China, which has 2.0 TSI and R-Line kit as highlights.

The basic design of the import model is the same as the international one. Due to the regulations, Shanghai-VW Tiguan is given a Chinese name, known as 途观 (tiguan), and the import one keeps the original letter name to differ locally built and import models.

Since the launch of the second generation Tiguan, the first generation Tiguan continued to be sold in China as the Tiguan Silk Road until it was discontinued in 2020.

North America 

The Tiguan was launched in United States and Canada in May 2008 for the 2009 model year. It was powered by a direct-injected and turbocharged  2.0-litre petrol engine. Imported from Germany, Volkswagen of America had positioned the first generation Tiguan as a niche product due to its high price tag impacted by a crippling dollar-euro exchange, with annual sales of 20,000 to 25,000 units. As the result, sales were proved lackluster compared to its rivals, with only 175,606 Tiguans sold in the United States between 2008 and 2015.

Tiguan Limited (2017–2018) 
In April 2017, Volkswagen of America announced that it would continue to sell its outgoing Tiguan alongside the second generation model, rebranding it as the Volkswagen Tiguan Limited. Due to slow sales compared to the second generation model, the Tiguan Limited was discontinued after the 2018 model year.

Safety

Euro NCAP

Insurance Institute for Highway Safety (IIHS)

NHTSA

Facelift (2012) 
Volkswagen updated the Tiguan with a facelift for 2012 models, which was revealed at the 2011 Geneva Motor Show. The headlights were made bolder and more angular, and the prominent horizontal grille bars of the Golf and new Passat were incorporated, as were the angular line design in the two-part taillight clusters. Performance was also enhanced. The interior trim was revised with an updated three spoke steering wheel and gear selector.

Pre-facelift styling

Post-facelift styling

HyMotion 
At the November 2007 Michelin Challenge Bibendum, in Shanghai, China, Volkswagen showed the Tiguan HyMotion study powered by a hydrogen fuel cell.

The 6.8 ampere hour lithium-ion battery can be charged by the fuel cell or by recovered braking energy.

Second generation (AD/BW; 2016) 

The second generation Tiguan was unveiled at the Frankfurt International Motor Show in September 2015 for the 2016 model year, now built on the Volkswagen Group MQB A2 platform. A common misconception is that the Tiguan is built on the MQB A1 chassis that underpins the Mk7 series Volkswagen Golf. While the MQB A2 chassis is based upon the MQB A1 platform, there are several differences between the more entry level MQB A1 and the mid range MQB A2. It shares the same dashboard design with the Golf Sportsvan.

As a result, VW claimed interior space has been improved, with rear passengers having  more knee room. Furthermore, the rear bench seat is asymmetrically split and can be adjusted up to  longitudinally.

It is available in two wheelbase variants: a short-wheelbase (SWB) version (referred as "normal wheelbase" (NWB) by Volkswagen) with available seating up to five passengers, and a long-wheelbase (LWB) version with third-row seats, which it seats up to seven passengers. The latter was revealed in March 2017, offering  longer wheelbase and the  longer body. In some markets where the Tiguan is sold in both SWB and LWB variants, the LWB Tiguan is sold as the Tiguan Allspace or Tiguan L. The LWB version is manufactured in Mexico to supply worldwide markets (except China), with some countries importing them as knock-down kits.

Facelift 
The updated Tiguan was released on 30 June 2020, along with the introduction of the Tiguan R and Tiguan . The updated Tiguan features newly designed headlamps, radiator grille, and broader bumper intakes similar to the Mk8 Golf, along with a new bonnet, LED tail lights, and rear diffuser. A new multifunction 'digital' steering wheel is offered and a redesigned centre dashboard incorporates a new touchscreen display with VW’s latest MIB3 software. Also new is Volkswagen’s IQ Drive feature, which can take over the steering, braking and acceleration of the vehicle.

Tiguan R 
For the first time, the Tiguan line-up also includes the performance-oriented R variant. Other performance upgrades of the Tiguan R include lowered suspension, 21-inch wheels, upgraded brakes, and an available Akrapovič exhaust. A driving mode selector is included complete with a “Race” setting which can be prompted by a dedicated button on the steering wheel.

Tiguan X 
A coupé SUV version of the Tiguan was revealed in China as the Tiguan X in September 2020. The styling is based on the facelifted Tiguan and the chassis is based on the long wheelbase version of the Tiguan which means it retains its  wheelbase.

Markets

North America 
The second generation long-wheelbase Tiguan was unveiled for the North American market at the 2017 North American International Auto Show, with sales starting in summer 2017 for the 2018 model year. At launch in the US, it is offered in four trim levels: S, SE, SEL and SEL Premium and 3 in Canada: Trendline, Comfortline and Highline. The R-Line Package later became available for the SEL and SEL Premium models (Highline in Canada) in early 2018, and was showcased at the 2017 Los Angeles Auto Show. In the US market, it is available in front-wheel drive or Volkswagen's 4Motion all-wheel drive system, with third-row seats being standard on front-wheel drive models and optional on all-wheel drive models.

Only one engine choice is available for the North American-spec Tiguan, a 2.0-litre TSI four-cylinder gasoline engine, mated with an 8-speed torque converter automatic transmission.

The Tiguan will be updated for the North American market in 2022, with similar exterior and interior changes as the short wheelbase European model. Standard LED lights, a different grille, as well as new wheel designs will be present. On the interior, there is a new steering wheel as well as a standard 8-inch digital gauge cluster. The infotainment system will also be updated with wireless Apple Carplay and Android Auto being offered on all but the base model. The Tiguan's powertrain remains unchanged, and the third row option will no longer be offered on AWD models.

The 2022 Tiguan has new standard safety features: blind-spot monitoring, forward-collision warning, and rear traffic alert. Other safety features are available, for instance automatic high beam, parking assist, and dynamic road sign recognition.

All trims but the base 2022 Tiguan come with the "IQ.Drive" safety suite, which includes features such as forward-collision warning, autonomous emergency braking with pedestrian monitoring, blind-spot monitoring, lane keep assist, adaptive cruise control, and travel assist (semi-automated or Level 2 driving assistance).

Mexico 
The second generation Volkswagen Tiguan was launched in Mexico, around the same time as the North American launch, with sales starts at the same time as the US models for the 2018 model year. Like the US and Canadian models, it is only available as a LWB variant with optional third-row seats and initially available in four trim levels: Trendline, Trendline Plus, Comfortline, and Highline. The R-Line was later added to the Mexican lineup as a separated trim level. The lower trim levels of the Tiguan were powered by a 1.4-litre TSI engine, a 2.0-litre TSI engine is only available to the Highline model. The Mexican-built Tiguan was qualified 5 stars by Latin NCAP in 2019 in both infant and adult passengers, and is awarded two Latin NCAP Advanced Awards, one for its pedestrian safety system and other for AEB (Autonomous Emergency Braking).

The locally-built Tiguan was later facelifted for the Mexican market on 9 September 2021 for the 2022 model year, discontinuing the Trendline Plus and Highline trim levels.

China 
The second generation Tiguan was launched in China by SAIC-Volkswagen in January 2017, available in both SWB and LWB variants and sold alongside the previous generation Tiguan, which was continued to be sold in China as the Tiguan Silk Road. The LWB Tiguan is marketed there as the Tiguan L. Both Chinese-spec Tiguans are locally assembled and offered in three trim levels: 280TSI, 330TSI and 380TSI. SAIC Volkswagen only produces Tiguan L and X; the SWB version is imported from Germany. A fastback variant based on the post-facelift model called the Tiguan X is available from October 2020.

Australia 
The second generation Tiguan was first announced for the Australian market in October 2015, about one month after its debut in IAA. Pricing and specifications were made available in July 2016, with the local press releasing details to the market. Sales of the Tiguan in Australia started in September 2016. At launch, it was initially offered in three trim levels: Trendline, Comfortline and Highline. The R-Line Package is also offered and it is only available on the Highline models. The Sportline trim was later added to the Australian lineup in December 2017. The LWB Tiguan Allspace was announced for Australia in April 2018, with the pricing and specifications were later revealed in June 2018. The Tiguan Allspace went on sale in Australia in July 2018 and it is available in two trim levels: Comfortline and Highline. Like the SWB model, the R-Line Package is also offered for the LWB model. The Trendline model on the SWB Tiguan was discontinued in August 2018.

India 
The second generation Tiguan was launched in India on May 24, 2017, initially available in the SWB variant. It was available in two trim levels: Comfortline and Highline. The Indian-spec Tiguan is locally assembled at Volkswagen India's Aurangabad plant. The launch of the Tiguan in the Indian market marks Volkswagen India's return to the SUV segment, since the Touareg was discontinued there in 2013. The LWB Tiguan Allspace was showcased at the Auto Expo 2020 and was launched to the Indian market in March 2020. The facelift Tiguan was launched in India on 7 December 2021.

Malaysia 
The second generation Volkswagen Tiguan was launched in Malaysia on April 5, 2017, only the SWB variant is available there. It was offered with two trim levels: Comfortline and Highline. The Malaysian-spec Tiguan is locally assembled at HICOM Automotive's plant in Pekan, front-wheel drive only and powered by a 1.4-litre TSI engine. In 2020, Volkswagen launced the LWB variant of the Tiguan in Malaysia. The LWB variant of the Tiguan will be sold as the Tiguan Allspace in Malaysia. It will be sold alongside the SWB variant. The LWB version will be imported from Mexico as HICOM Automotive only produces the SWB variant of the Tiguan. The Tiguan Allspace will be available in two trim levels: Highline and R-Line 4Motion. The Tiguan Allspace Highline will be powered by a 1.4-litre TSI engine while the Tiguan Allspace R-Line 4Motion is powered by a 2.0-litre TSI engine.

Indonesia 
The second generation Tiguan was first launched in Indonesia at the 25th Gaikindo Indonesia International Auto Show in August 2017 as a SWB variant, under Volkswagen's distributor and assembler for the Indonesian market, Garuda Mataram Motor. The Tiguan Allspace was launched in July 2019, replacing the SWB variant. It is now locally assembled at GMM's plant in Purwakarta, West Java as a medium knock down (MKD) unit to avoid large import tax. It is powered by the same 1.4-litre TSI engine from the previous version and it is only available in one trim level.

Special trim levels and limited editions 
Through to its production, the Tiguan have received various special trim levels and limited edition models in some markets.

In Australia, Volkswagen Australia has launched two limited edition models for the Tiguan exclusively for the Australian market in each respectively dates, the first being the Wolfsburg Edition, available on the SWB model in November 2018, with a limited up to 500 units. The second being the R-Line, available also on the SWB model in April 2019, with only 1000 units being sold.

At the 2018 Moscow International Automobile Salon, Volkswagen unveiled the Tiguan Offroad for the European market, it features a characteristic off-road exterior design, compared to the normal Tiguan, including different bumper designs with skid plates, black chrome window trim strips, black roof rails and side mirror covers, and a special "OFFROAD" badge located on the B-pillar. For the interior, it features comfortable front seats with the centre storage compartment wrapped in fabric leather, black headliner, multifunction steering wheel, gear knob wrapped in leather, aluminum trim, stainless steel pedals and rubber floor mats. It is available in six different colors, with a two-tone combination look with a black roof as a part of the optional Offroad Plus package and a standard 18-inch "Sebring" alloy wheels with three alternative wheel options available. The Tiguan Offroad is offered in various range of diesel and gasoline engines, it is mated by a 7-speed DSG transmission as standard, along with 4Motion all-wheel drive featuring Active Control system, which can be switched between three driving modes: Onroad, Offroad and Snow.

In Mexico, a special exclusive limited edition model for the Mexican-spec Tiguan was launched there on October 15, 2019. It is based on the Comfortline model.

Powertrain

Europe

North America

China

Safety

Latin NCAP
In its most basic Latin American configuration with 6 airbags and ESC, it received 5 stars for adult occupants, 5 stars for infants and Advanced Award from Latin NCAP in 2019.

IIHS
The 2022 Tiguan was tested by the IIHS and earned a Top Safety Pick+ award:

Sales 

† excluding imported models

References

External links

 

Tiguan
Cars introduced in 2007
2010s cars
2020s cars
Compact sport utility vehicles
Crossover sport utility vehicles
Front-wheel-drive vehicles
All-wheel-drive vehicles
Euro NCAP small off-road
Latin NCAP small off-road